Travis Shook (born March 10, 1969) is a jazz pianist who made his eponymous Columbia Records debut in a quartet that included Tony Williams and Bunky Green. He was born in Oroville, California. He received much critical acclaim for this first effort, but failed to hold on to the contract when Sony purged a large percentage of the Columbia jazz roster upon acquiring the label in 1993.  After spending some time as a member of the Betty Carter Trio, he dropped out of the public eye for a number of years.

In 1993, Shook and his wife, jazz singer Veronica Nunn, started their own record label, Dead Horse Records, which has released four recordings to date.  Shook grew up in Olympia, Washington, moved to New York City in the mid-1990s and currently resides in Woodstock, New York.

Selected discography

As leader
 Travis Shook
 Awake
 Travis Shook Plays Kurt Weill
 Travis Shook - Trio

As sideman
With Sonny Simmons
 American Jungle
 Reincarnation

With Veronica Nunn
 American Lullaby
 Standard Delivery
 The Art of Michael Franks

With Jay Thomas
 Rapture

With Skip Walker
 Tina's Contemplation

External links
[ All Music]
Official Website

American jazz pianists
American male pianists
Jazz songwriters
Living people
Musicians from Olympia, Washington
1969 births
People from Oroville, California
20th-century American pianists
21st-century American pianists
20th-century American male musicians
21st-century American male musicians
American male jazz musicians
Jazz musicians from California